The Negreni is a right tributary of the river Amaradia in Romania. It flows into the Amaradia between the villages Negreni and Busuioci.

References

Rivers of Romania
Rivers of Gorj County